Kubusu No.2 Dam is a gravity dam located in Toyama prefecture in Japan. The dam is used for power production. The catchment area of the dam is 41 km2. The dam impounds about 2  ha of land when full and can store 132 thousand cubic meters of water. The construction of the dam was started on 1937 and completed in 1941.

References

Dams in Toyama Prefecture
1941 establishments in Japan